Worth County is a county located in the south-central portion of the U.S. state of Georgia.

As of the 2020 census, the population was 20,784. The county seat is Sylvester.

Worth County is included in the Albany, GA Metropolitan Statistical Area.

History
Worth County was created from Dooly and Irwin counties on December 20, 1853, by an act of the Georgia General Assembly, becoming Georgia's 106th county. It was named for Major General William J. Worth of New York.

In 1905, portions of Worth County were used to create Tift and Turner counties.

Geography

The eastern third of Worth County, from west of State Route 33 heading east, is located in the Little River sub-basin of the Suwannee River basin. The northern third of the county is located in the Middle Flint River sub-basin of the ACF River Basin (Apalachicola-Chattahoochee-Flint River Basin). A narrow portion of the western edge of Worth County is located in the Lower Flint River sub-basin of the same ACF River basin. Finally, a portion of the southwest of the county, north of Doerun, is located in the Upper Ochlockonee River sub-basin of the larger Ochlockonee River basin.

Major highways

  U.S. Route 82
  State Route 32
  State Route 33
  State Route 112
  State Route 133
  State Route 256
  State Route 300
  State Route 313
  State Route 520

Adjacent counties
 Crisp County - north
 Tift County - east
 Turner County - northeast
 Colquitt County - south
 Mitchell County - southwest
 Lee County - northwest
 Dougherty County - west

Demographics

2000 census
As of the census of 2000, there were 21,967 people, 8,106 households, and 6,120 families living in the county. There were 9,086 housing units at an average density of 16 per square mile (6/km2). The racial makeup of the county was 68.69% White, 29.57% Black or African American, 0.36% Native American, 0.22% Asian, 0.01% Pacific Islander, 0.61% from other races, and 0.55% from two or more races. 1.09% of the population were Hispanic or Latino of any race.

There were 8,106 households, out of which 36.3% had children under the age of 18 living with them, 55.7% were married couples living together, 15.7% had a female householder with no husband present, and 24.5% were non-families. 21.5% of all households were made up of individuals, and 9% had someone living alone who was 65 years of age or older. The average household size was 2.68 and the average family size was 3.12.

In the county, the population was spread out, with 28.6% under the age of 18, 8.1% from 18 to 24, 27.50% from 25 to 44, 23.90% from 45 to 64, and 12% who were 65 years of age or older.  The median age was 36 years. For every 100 females, there were 92.00 males.  For every 100 females aged 18 and over, there were 87.80 males.

The median income for a household in the county was $32,384, and the median income for a family was $38,887. Males had a median income of $31,668 versus $20,950 for females. The per capita income for the county was $15,856. 18.50% of the population and 14.7% of families were below the poverty line.   25% of those under the age of 18 and 20.2% of those 65 and older were living below the poverty line.

2010 census
As of the 2010 United States Census, there were 21,679 people, 8,214 households, and 6,032 families living in the county. The racial makeup of the county was 70.3% white, 27.6% black or African American, 0.3% Asian, 0.3% American Indian, 0.5% from other races, and 1.1% from two or more races. Those of Hispanic or Latino origin made up 1.5% of the population. In terms of ancestry, 16.3% were American, 11.5% were Irish, 7.3% were German, and 6.9% were English.

Of the 8,214 households, 35.1% had children under the age of 18 living with them, 50.8% were married couples living together, 17.1% had a female householder with no husband present, 26.6% were non-families, and 23.4% of all households were made up of individuals. The average household size was 2.62 and the average family size was 3.07. The median age was 39.7 years.

The median income for a household in the county was $38,670 and the median income for a family was $46,791. Males had a median income of $35,829 versus $26,690 for females. The per capita income for the county was $18,348. About 15.6% of families and 20.8% of the population were below the poverty line, including 29.0% of those under age 18 and 16.7% of those age 65 or over.

2020 census

As of the 2020 United States census, there were 20,784 people, 8,002 households, and 5,896 families residing in the county.

Communities

Cities
 Poulan
 Sylvester
 Warwick

Town
 Sumner

Unincorporated communities
 Acree
 Bridgeboro

Politics

See also

 National Register of Historic Places listings in Worth County, Georgia
List of counties in Georgia

References

External links
 Worth County School District
 Historical maps of Worth County
 Worth County Board of Commissioners
 Worth County Sheriff's Office

 
Georgia (U.S. state) counties
1853 establishments in Georgia (U.S. state)
Albany metropolitan area, Georgia
Populated places established in 1853